Duane may refer to:

 Duane (given name)
 Duane (surname)
 Duane, New York, a US town
 the title character of Duane Hopwood, a 2005 film featured in the Sundance Film Festival
 Duane Adelier, a main character of Unsounded, a 2012 fantasy adventure graphic novel
 USCGC Duane (WPG-33), a US Coast Guard cutter and artificial-reef shipwreck

See also
 Duane syndrome, a rare type of strabismus